The 2016 Trofeo Laigueglia was a one-day road cycling race that took place on 14 February 2016 in and around Laigueglia. It was the 53rd edition of the Trofeo Laigueglia and was rated as a 1.HC event as part of the 2016 UCI Europe Tour. The champion of the 2015 Trofeo Laigueglia, Davide Cimolai, was not selected as part of the  team.

The race was won by Andrea Fedi. He broke away with a small group in the closing kilometres, then attacked on the final climbs. He held off a small chasing group to take a solo win, with Sonny Colbrelli second and Grega Bole third. It was the first professional victory of Fedi's career.

Teams 

Eighteen teams were invited to take part in the race. Three of these were UCI WorldTeams; seven were UCI Professional Continental teams; seven were UCI Continental teams; the final team was an Italian national team.

Result

References

External links 

 

Trofeo Laigueglia
Trofeo Laigueglia
2016